India Foundation for the Arts (IFA) is a national, non-profit, the grantmaking organisation that supports the practice, research and education in the arts in India. Established as a public trust in 1993, IFA is headquartered in Bangalore.  Its founder-director, Anmol Vellani previously worked for the Ford Foundation. IFA's mission is to enrich the arts in India, by providing support for innovative projects and capacity building across all the arts.

Management
The Founder Director, Anmol Vellani, is a professional in arts management and organised philanthropy. Our current Executive Director, Arundhati Ghosh is an internationally recognised professional in the arts and organised philanthropy.

The staff at IFA comes with diverse backgrounds and experiences and is encouraged to engage with and respond to the changing needs and aspirations of the field.

The board of trustees bring to their work considerable experience in the arts and humanities, industry, finance, public affairs, communication and law. They share a common passion for the enrichment of arts and culture.

Programmes

The grant programmes of IFA respond to demand for assistance, while also giving encouragement to new perspectives and directions in the arts. IFA has made over 450 grants across states.

The Arts Research programme supports scholars, researchers, and practitioners to undertake research into the histories and expressions of artistic practices in India. It seeks to foster wider perspectives, understandings, interpretations and engagements in the arts.

The Arts Education programme places the school teacher at the centre of its work and supports artists through grants, towards arts-based education in Government Schools in Karnataka. It maintains a continuous dialogue with the National Council of Educational Research and Training, the Directorate of Public Instruction, Karnataka, the Department of State Education, Research and Training, Karnataka, and Sarva Shiksha Abhiyan, to intensify its capacity building programme.

The Arts Practice programme supports critical practice in the arts. It encourages practitioners working across artistic disciplines to question existing notions through their practice. The programme seeks to establish a culture where arts practice is constantly being shaped and articulated through experimentation, critique and dialogue.

The Archival and Museum Fellowships support practitioners and researchers to activate the collections in archives and museums through curatorial and artistic interventions. The fellowships enable collections to come alive and be made accessible to a large public, with the hope that this engagement will allow museums and archives, to function less as repositories and more as sites that influence discourse, and creativity in the arts.

Board of Trustees
 Rathi Vinay Jha, Civil Service, Delhi is the Chairperson
 Ashoke Chatterjee, Humanities and Education, Ahmedabad
 Bina Paul, Cinema, Bangalore
 Chiranjiv Singh, Civil Service, Bangalore
 Githa Hariharan, Literature, New Delhi
 Ishaat Hussain, Industry, Mumbai
 Kiran Nadar, Arts and Education, New Delhi
 Lalit Bhasin, Law, New Delhi
 Pramit Jhaveri, Finance, Mumbai
 Priya Paul, Industry, New Delhi
 Aman Nath, Industry, New Delhi
 Saajan Poovayya, Law, Bangalore
 Sheba Chhachhi, Visual Arts, New Delhi
 Shubha Mudgal, Music, New Delhi

Patrons

Amitav Ghosh,
Ebrahim Alkazi,
Naseeruddin Shah,
Shekhar Kapur,
Shyam Benegal and
Ustad Amjad Ali Khan

External links
 IFA website
  All the world's a stage, quite literally, HT Brunch, 27 July 2014 
 For the sense of seamless perspective, The Hindu, 23 July 2014
 http://www.ndtv.com/video/player/news/art-comes-alive-on-bangalore-s-streets/325708 Art Comes Alive on Bangalore's Streets, NDTV, 14 and 15 July 2014
http://www.livemint.com/Leisure/J5D60o7E2vLURRgDoC2ZMJ/Why-we-dont-value-our-arts-enough.html Why we don’t value our arts enough, 17 August 2013
Chronicles of Bangalore retold, 6 June 2014
  Guerrilla Art, Business Standard, 8 March 2014

Notes

Arts organisations based in India
Foundations based in India
Non-profit organisations based in India
Organisations based in Bangalore
Arts organizations established in 1993
Arts foundations based in Asia
1993 establishments in Karnataka